Seidi Helena Alexandra Haarla (born 1 January 1984) is a Finnish actress. She played the female lead in Juho Kuosmanen's film Compartment No. 6 (2021). She won the European Film Promotion (EFP) Shooting Stars Award for her role as one of the most promising film actors of the year.

Early life
Haarla was born in 1984 in Kirkkonummi in southern Finland. She comes from a family of actors and artists. Her father is artist Teuri Haarla (* 1955). Her younger sister Ruusu Haarla (* 1989) is a playwright and director. Her grandparents were actor Saulo Haarla (1930–1971) and soprano and actress Helena Salonius (1930–2012); her great-grandparents include stage actress Tyyne Haarla (1892–1968) and writer Lauri Haarla (1890–1944).

Career
In 2004, Haarla appeared in a student theater group in Helsinki. In 2005, she studied acting at the Russian State Institute of Performing Arts in Saint Petersburg. She graduated from University of the Arts Helsinki in 2015 with a Master of Arts in Theater and Drama.

Together with her sister Ruusu, Haarla wrote the plays The Trauma Body (2014) and New Childhood (2020), which were inspired by her own childhood experiences, and she also appeared on stage in their productions.

Haarla has appeared in Finnish film and television productions since 2015. In 2021, she took on the female leading role of Laura in Juho Kuosmanen's film drama Compartment No. 6, which is based on Rosa Liksom's novel of the same name. Her performance earned her critical acclaim and an award as one of the European Shooting Stars 2021. Haarla was nominated for Best Actress at the European Film Awards 2021.

Personal life
Haarla is married with three children and lives in Turku.

References

External links
 

1984 births
Living people
People from Kirkkonummi
Finnish film actresses
Finnish stage actresses
Finnish television actresses
20th-century Finnish actresses
21st-century Finnish actresses